The Adams Effect, is the final album recorded by baritone saxophonist Pepper Adams which was originally released on the Uptown label in 1988 following Adams' death in 1986.

Reception 

The Allmusic review by Scott Yanow states: "Adams still sounded in prime form at the time and, even if none of his tunes became standards, they served as strong and diverse vehicles for the musicians' improvisations. A fine effort by a classic baritone saxophonist".

Track listing 
All compositions by Pepper Adams, except where noted.
 "Binary" – 6:57
 "Now in Our Lives" – 6:56
 "Valse Celtique" – 5:45
 "Dylan's Delight" – 6:21
 "How I Spent the Night" (Frank Foster) – 7:02
 "Claudette's Way" – 7:27
 "Now in Our Lives" [alternate take] – 8:44 Bonus track on CD release

Personnel 
Pepper Adams – baritone saxophone
Frank Foster – tenor saxophone
Tommy Flanagan – piano
Ron Carter – bass
Billy Hart – drums

References 

Pepper Adams albums
1988 albums
Uptown Records (jazz) albums
Albums recorded at Van Gelder Studio